Zapreval (in older sources also Zaprevolam) is a dispersed settlement in the Škofja Loka Hills in the Municipality of Gorenja Vas–Poljane in the Upper Carniola region of Slovenia.

Name
Zapreval was attested in historical sources as Prewalt in 1291, Prewal in 1453, and Dolenigriboitzi and Gorenigriboitzi in 1500, among other names and spellings. The name is a fused prepositional phrase that has lost case inflection, from za 'behind' + Preval (literally, 'crest, mountain pass'), referring to its position behind Preval Hill (elevation ) southeast of the village. Locally, the village is also known as za Prevalom.

Recreation
Zapreval lies by the Stari Vrh ski slopes with fifty hectares of slopes, a new 6-chair lift and 5 ski tows.

References

External links

Zapreval on Geopedia

Populated places in the Municipality of Gorenja vas-Poljane